Manohara Maski was a member of the Legislative Council of the state of Karnataka, India. He hails from the town of Raichur. He belongs to the Bharatiya Janata Party.

References

1961 births
Living people
Bharatiya Janata Party politicians from Karnataka
Members of the Karnataka Legislative Council